Paw Paw is a village in the U.S. state of Michigan.  The population was 3,534 at the 2010 census.  It is the county seat of Van Buren County.

Overview

The village is located at the confluence of the east and south branches of the Paw Paw River in the northeast portion of Paw Paw Township.

The town was the home of African American cookbook author Malinda Russell who published the first known cookbook by a black woman in the United States. She lived in Paw Paw after she fled her Tennessee home, which was raided by traveling gangs of whites in 1864. Her book Domestic Cook Book: Containing a Careful Selection of Useful Receipts for the Kitchen, as a means to provide income for her and her son and earn money to return  to Greeneville, Tennessee. Russell self-published her book, in 1866, giving a brief history of her life and stating in the preface to it that she hoped to earn passage to return home from its proceeds. Within months of her publication, the town of Paw Paw was destroyed by fire. 

On June 13, 1888, fire again erupted, destroying seven buildings (including 11 businesses and 2 lodges) in the village.

Paw Paw is in a rural location whose primary agricultural product is grapes, which are used both in the local Michigan wine industry and for juice and jellies. The St. Julian Winery and Warner's Winery started in Paw Paw. Paw Paw has an annual Wine and Harvest Festival, which traditionally occurs the weekend following Labor Day. The Festival features a beer tent, bandstand, live music, a popular grape stomping competition among barefoot locals, carnival foods, and fireworks over scenic Maple Lake. For three days, the village opens up to celebrate its agricultural roots: its fruit-growing, juice, and wine-making industries. Activities in every corner of the village include the traditional grape stomping, wine tasting, 5K run, bicycle classic, and carnival midway, with new fun added each year.

Paw Paw is named for the pawpaw trees which once grew along the Paw Paw River. 

The vignette "Paw Paw for Jesus" was featured on NPR's  This American Life.

Historic sites

Listed in the National Register for Historic places is the Van Buren County Courthouse at 212 E. Paw Paw Street, wherein the first election was held in 1837. Renovations were completed in 1999.

Geography

Major highways

Red Arrow Highway

Demographics

2010 census
As of the census of 2010, there were 3,534 people, 1,499 households, and 862 families living in the village. The racial makeup of the village was 92.3% White, 2.3% African American, 0.2% Native American, 0.4% Asian, 2.2% from other races, and 2.7% from two or more races. Hispanic or Latino of any race were 5.9% of the population.

There were 1,499 households, of which 31.2% had children under the age of 18 living with them, 34.6% were married couples living together, 17.5% had a female householder with no husband present, 5.5% had a male householder with no wife present, and 42.5% were non-families. 35.6% of all households were made up of individuals, and 13.2% had someone living alone who was 65 years of age or older. The average household size was 2.27 and the average family size was 2.91.

The median age in the village was 36.4 years. 24.2% of residents were under the age of 18; 9.5% were between the ages of 18 and 24; 27.1% were from 25 to 44; 25.3% were from 45 to 64; and 13.8% were 65 years of age or older. The gender makeup of the village was 48.5% male and 51.5% female.

2000 census
As of the census of 2000, there were 3,363 people, 1,417 households, and 855 families living in the village. The racial makeup of the village was 92.83% White, 2.85% African American, 0.83% Native American, 0.27% Asian, 0.06% Pacific Islander, 1.19% from other races, and 1.96% from two or more races. Hispanic or Latino of any race were 2.97% of the population.

There were 1,417 households, out of which 29.7% had children under the age of 18 living with them, 41.2% were married couples living together, 14.9% had a female householder with no husband present, and 39.6% were non-families. 32.7% of all households were made up of individuals, and 12.3% had someone living alone who was 65 years of age or older.  The average household size was 2.27 and the average family size was 2.86.

In the village, the population was spread out, with 23.3% under the age of 18, 10.0% from 18 to 24, 30.2% from 25 to 44, 21.5% from 45 to 64, and 15.0% who were 65 years of age or older.  The median age was 36 years. For every 100 females, there were 93.5 males.  For every 100 females age 18 and over, there were 90.3 males.

The median income for a household in the village was $38,750, and the median income for a family was $50,889. Males had a median income of $36,548 versus $29,559 for females. The per capita income for the village was $21,859.  About 1.9% of families and 5.7% of the population were below the poverty line, including 3.1% of those under age 18 and 3.4% of those age 65 or over.

Education 
Paw Paw Public Schools is the school district serving the community.

Notable people 

 Jason Babin, football player for Western Michigan, first-round NFL draft pick
 John Bonamego, football head coach at Central Michigan University; previously assistant coach with NFL's Miami Dolphins, Jacksonville Jaguars, Green Bay Packers and Detroit Lions
 Frank R. Gooding, Governor of Idaho 1905-09, U.S. Senator 1921-28; raised in Paw Paw
 Doane Harrison, Oscar-nominated film editor, best known for his long collaboration with director Billy Wilder
 Bill and Wade Killefer, early 20th-century baseball players
 Ricky Knotts, racecar driver killed attempting to qualify for 1981 Daytona 500
 Joseph Labadie, labor leader and political activist
 Ron Labadie, head of scouting for NFL's Miami Dolphins
 Loretta Long, actress and educator, best known as "Susan Robinson" on Sesame Street
 Charlie Maxwell ("Old Paw Paw"), a former Detroit Tigers, Boston Red Sox, Baltimore Orioles and Chicago White Sox baseball player
 Jerry Mitchell, Tony Award-winning choreographer
 Don Moorhead, football player for  Michigan 1969-1970, Canadian Football League quarterback
 Malinda Russell, cookbook author
 Frederick S. Strong, US Army major general
 A. W. Underwood, a 19th-century Paw Paw native with the purported ability to set items ablaze. Brian Eno's 1974 song about Underwood, "The Paw Paw Negro Blowtorch", references the village.
 Abraham Wechter, master luthier of Wechter Guitars
 Shayne Whittington, NBA basketball player for the Indiana Pacers

See also 
 Kalamazoo, Lake Shore and Chicago Railway
 List of reduplicated place names

References

Citations

Bibliography

External links 
 

Villages in Van Buren County, Michigan
Villages in Michigan
County seats in Michigan
Kalamazoo–Portage metropolitan area